Powhatan is a historic home located near Five Forks, James City County, Virginia. The house was designed by its owner Richard Taliaferro (c. 1705–1779) and built about 1750.  It is a two-story, five bay by two bay Georgian style brick dwelling.  It has a hipped roof with dormers and features two massive interior end T-shaped chimneys. The house was gutted by fire during the American Civil War.  It was thoroughly restored in 1948.

It was listed on the National Register of Historic Places in 1970.

References

External links
Powhatan, Powhatan Creek, Williamsburg, Williamsburg, VA: 1 photo, 1 measured drawing, and 2 data pages at Historic American Buildings Survey

Historic American Buildings Survey in Virginia
Houses on the National Register of Historic Places in Virginia
Georgian architecture in Virginia
Houses completed in 1750
Houses in James City County, Virginia
National Register of Historic Places in James City County, Virginia
Taliaferro family of Virginia